The Pegasus PE-210A is a prototype of a single-engine Trainer with canard developed by Oaxaca Aerospace and TechBA.

Design and development 
Oaxaca Aerospace began the project in 2011 with the objective of designing an agile, fast and inexpensive two-seat airplane and concluded in mid-2013, the year in which the ground tests began. The aircraft has a rear mounted Lycoming AEIO-390 engine, canards and a tandem design cockpit with dual flight controls. The rear seat is at a higher level with respect to the front seat, which allows a view of 300° vertical and 240° horizontal. The aircraft was first presented to the public at Feria Aeroespacial México (FAMEX) 2015.

Specifications 
Data from FAMEX 2015

General characteristics 
Crew: 2
Length: 7.4 m
Wingspan: 8.9 m
Wing area: 12.5 m^2
Canard area: 1.48 m^2
Max. takeoff weight: 1250 kg
Payload: 350 kg
Powerplant: 1x Lycoming AEIO-390 210 HP
Fuel capacity: 210 L

Performance 
Maximum speed: 221 kn / 410 km/h
Cruise speed: 162 kn / 300 km/h
Stall speed: 64 kn / 118 km/h
Service ceiling: 18000 ft / 5400 m
Range: 864 nmi / 1600 km

References 

Experimental aircraft
Canard aircraft
Single-engined pusher aircraft
Proposed aircraft of Mexico